Miguel António do Amaral (Lisbon; 1710 – Lisbon; 1780) was a Portuguese court painter to the House of Braganza, progressing in the years from the household of Joseph I of Portugal to that of Maria I of Portugal and finally to the household of José, Prince of Brazil.

1773 Commission 
In 1773, Amaral was commissioned by Joseph I of Portugal to make two sets of portraits featuring the King and his wife, Mariana Victoria of Spain. After the completion of his grandfather's set of portraits in mid-1773, José, Prince of Beira ordered a similar commission by Amaral. However, he also asked for a second portrait of José, for his mother, Maria I of Portugal. These works would gain Amaral incredible fame throughout Portugal and Europe as an able portrait painter, having done five incredibly detailed and large portraits in one year.

References 

Museu do Hospital e das Caldas

Painters at the Portuguese royal court
Portuguese painters
Portuguese male painters
1710 births
1780 deaths
Place of birth missing